Expedition 35 was the 35th long-duration mission to the International Space Station (ISS). The expedition started 13 March 2013, and marked the first time a Canadian astronaut – Colonel Chris Hadfield – was in command of the station. Expedition 35 was also only the second time an ISS crew is led by neither a NASA astronaut, nor a Roscosmos cosmonaut, after Expedition 21 in 2009, when ESA astronaut Frank De Winne was in command. The expedition lasted two months.

Crew

Source
NASA

Mission highlights
The mission generated considerable media attention and turned Cmdr. Chris Hadfield into a minor celebrity. The expedition made extensive use of social media, and several videos uploaded to YouTube have generated millions of hits.  In particular, Cmdr. Hadfield was involved in the "first music video recorded in space", a rendition of David Bowie's 1969 song "Space Oddity".  Cmdr. Hadfield was also involved in the revealing of the Bank of Canada's new $5 note, part of the Frontier Series of polymer bills released in 2013. The revealing occurred via video on the ISS.

During Expedition 35, the SpaceX CRS-2 mission successfully delivered supplies to the station and returned some cargo from space.  This was the second of SpaceX's contracted cargo flights to the ISS and the first to use the unpressurized trunk section.

On 11 May 11 2013, Christopher Cassidy and Thomas Marshburn performed an unplanned spacewalk to replace a pump controller box suspected to be the source of an ammonia coolant leak.

References

External links

NASA's Space Station Expeditions page
An edited version of Chris Hadfield's Space Oddity music video

 Expeditions to the International Space Station
2013 in spaceflight